The Unió Esportiva Rubí is a football club in Rubí, Barcelona, which is currently playing in Group 5 of the Tercera División, equivalent to the fourth category of the Spanish football league system.

History
It was June 30, 1912, when a group of young Ruby, after playing its first meeting (one month before) to Barcelona clubs decided to form a football club that would represent the town. Its first match was played to a team from the neighboring town of Castellbisbal. however, it was not until 1917 the employer Barcelona Joan Franch i Vilarnau, who was vacationing with his family in Ruby during the summer, proposed organic form the club in undertaking the formal creation of the club under the name Ruby Football Club, which will remain in effect until its demise in 1927. The club was refounded in 1932 with its current name: Unio Esportiva Ruby.

After the Civil War, military starts the Catalan Regional Second, to travel to 1991 between the categories of First Preferred Regional and Catalan, the year he got his first promotion to the Third Division. In the 1992-93 season with a historic rise (the most important in its history) to the Segunda División B after finishing third. In the Spanish third category is maintained for one year and down.

From 1998, begins a long period of institutional crisis and sporty, resulting in Atletico return to the regional categories, in the last 10 years, the team rubinense has passed between Catalan and Territorial First Preferred, with intermittent ups and downs, to and from the Third Division.

Season to season

1 season in Segunda División B
13 seasons in Tercera División

Controversy over the date of foundation and fake background

In the past 30 years, the club has proposed several founding dates, many of them have been wrong, even claiming that the club was founded in 1902 and therefore was the centenary 2002. This theory was disproved by historian Josep Maria Freixes rubinense that through his historical research has shown that football rubinense origin and genesis of the club is dated 1912, which was recognized by the Consell Català for Sport (Catalan Sports Council) in 2005  as for the Catalan Football Federation in 2006. The club, however, kept between 2003 and 2011 to 1902 as its founding until the end of June 2011, when the institution was finally recognized in 1912 as its foundation and at the same time, confirming the year 2012 as his centennial celebration.

Squad
As of 24 August 2014.

History

 Regional Preferente de Cataluña (3): 1999-00, 2002–03, 2008-09.
 Rise to Second Division B: 1992-93

Seasons 
In his season (2012-2013) he club has participated in 10 seasons at Third Division and 1 Second Division B.

References

Bibliography
There are books published by Josep Maria Freixes about EU Ruby:
Freixes Trujillo, Josep Maria: Unió Esportiva Rubí: 85 anys de futbol (1912-1997). Fecha de publicación: 1997 - 
Freixes Trujillo, Josep Maria: La Unió Esportiva Rubí, una història (1912-2004). Fecha de publicación: 2004 -

External links

Football clubs in Catalonia